The 1933 Ole Miss Rebels football team represented the University of Mississippi during the 1933 college football season. It was the first season of the Southeastern Conference.

Schedule

References

Ole Miss
Ole Miss Rebels football seasons
Ole Miss Rebels football